McKee Township is one of twenty-two townships in Adams County, Illinois, United States. As of the 2020 census, its population was 192 and it contained 100 housing units.

Geography

Unincorporated towns
 Spring Valley

Cemeteries
The township contains twelve cemeteries: Burden, Durbin, Fairview, Goertz, Grady, Harwood, Lierly, Padgett, Perrigo, Spring Valley, Stevens and Whiaker.

Lakes
 Crabapple Lake

Landmarks
 Siloam Springs State Park

Demographics
As of the 2020 census there were 192 people, 62 households, and 62 families residing in the township. The racial makeup of the township was 95.83% White, 1.56% African American, 1.04% Native American, 0.00% Asian, 0.00% Pacific Islander, 0.00% from other races, and 1.56% from two or more races. Hispanic or Latino of any race were 5.73% of the population.

There were 62 households, out of which 6.50% had children under the age of 18 living with them, 100.00% were married couples living together, none had a female householder with no spouse present, and none were non-families. No households were made up of individuals. The average household size was 2.11 and the average family size was 2.11.

The township's age distribution consisted of 12.2% under the age of 18, 0.0% from 18 to 24, 0% from 25 to 44, 3.1% from 45 to 64, and 84.7% who were 65 years of age or older. The median age was 74.5 years. For every 100 females, there were 129.8 males. For every 100 females age 18 and over, there were 121.2 males.

The median income for a household in the township was $120,885, and the median income for a family was $120,885. The per capita income for the township was $50,072. None of the population was below the poverty line.

School districts
 Camp Point Community Unit School District 3
 Liberty Community Unit School District 2

Political districts
 Illinois' 18th congressional district
 State House District 93
 State Senate District 47

References
 
 United States Census Bureau 2007 TIGER/Line Shapefiles
 United States National Atlas

External links
 List of Adams County township trustees
 City-Data.com
 Illinois State Archives

Townships in Adams County, Illinois
1849 establishments in Illinois
Townships in Illinois